Planning for Burial is the musical project of American musician and singer-songwriter Thom Wasluck. Based in Wilkes-Barre, Pennsylvania, Wasluck started to perform as "Burial" in 2005 and released the debut album, Leaving in 2009. Wasluck plays all instruments during both his home recordings and live performances.

History
Before performing as Planning for Burial, Wasluck played in local bands and recorded music with his 4 track recorder. In 2009, he released his debut album, Leaving, which was re-released by Enemies List Home Recordings in 2010. Following the re-release of the album, Wasluck recorded and released a series of tapes, EPs and splits in the following years.

In 2014, Planning for Burial released its second studio album, Desideratum, through The Flenser record label. In 2016, Planning for Burial released the As a Lover single through New York based record label The Native Sound. Planning for Burial has shared the stage with a wide range of music acts, including Chelsea Wolfe, Have A Nice Life and Deafheaven.

Musical style
Planning for Burial's music takes influences from a wide array of genres, and is labeled as "gloomgaze" and "experimental metal." According to Pitchfork critic Andy O'Connor, Thom Wasluck of Planning for Burial "filters post-metal, doom, ambient, and goth-rock through his own terminally miserable lens." Vice described the band as "a fully-contained, one-man band who delves into shoegaze, metal, black metal and other elements to craft somber, emotional songs," and compared its style to those of English post-metal band Jesu. New Noise Magazine argued that the act's sound "contains elements of slowcore, shoegaze, doom, drone, '90s alt rock, '80s goth, and black metal, while never being defined by any one of those genres." Jason Cook of PopMatters also drew parallels between the band's debut studio album, Leaving, and Nine Inch Nails' 1999 album, The Fragile.

Wasluck releases Planning for Burial on various mediums, including on floppy disks and cassette tape.

Discography
Studio albums
 Leaving (2009; re-released in 2010 by Enemies List Home Recordings)
 Desideratum (2014; The Flenser)
 Below the House (2017; The Flenser)

Split releases
 Lonesummer Split (2010; Music Ruins Lives)
 Dreamless Split (2013; Altar of Waste)
 Lonesummer Split (2013; Music Ruins Lives)
 Vile Process (Troubled By Insects Split) (2014; Apneic Void)
 Mischief Night (Liar in Wait split)" (2014; Broken Limbs Recordings)
 "Mother Room / Planning For Burial "To Be Everything" 7" Split (2015; The Native Sound)
 "Planning For Burial / Stress Waves 7" Split (2016; Nostalgium Directive)

Other releases
 Untitled (2011; Music Ruins Lives)
 Late Twenties Blues (2011; self-released)
 Quietly (2012; Tycho Magnetic Anomalies)
 I Miss Our Conversations, I'm Sorry (2012; Tycho Magnetic Anomalies)
 Reminder (2012; self-released)
 An Autumn Cassette or Leaves Will Bloom, Leaves Will Fall Long After We Are Gone (2012; self-released)
 Glowing Windows / Walk Alone (2013; self-released)
 Heaven or Atlantic City (2014; Tycho Magnetic Anomalies)
 Distances (2014; Bathetic Records)
 As A Lover (2016; The Native Sound)

Music videos
 "29 August 2012" (2014; dir. Gardenback)

References

External links
 
 

Musical groups established in 2005
Heavy metal musical groups from New Jersey
Rock music groups from New Jersey
American post-metal musical groups
American shoegaze musical groups
Shoegaze musicians
One-man bands
American post-rock groups
American avant-garde metal musical groups
American ambient music groups
Ambient musicians
People from Matawan, New Jersey